Okon Fuoko, Op. 58, is a ballet-pantomime for orchestra, vocal soloists, and choir by the Finnish composer Leevi Madetoja, who wrote the piece from 1925–27 concurrent with the composition of his Third Symphony. The Japonisme-influenced libretto is by Danish playwright Poul Knudsen. The story takes place in ancient Japan and, similar to Coppélia, centers around the (successful) efforts of the eponymous puppet-maker to bring a female creation to life. The result is a tragic love-triangle between the seductive doll, the infatuated Okon Fuoko, and his devastated wife. With its unique and exotic musical language, Okon Fuoko is one of Madetoja's "finest" scores; indeed, the last of his "masterpieces". 
 
Although critics praised Madetoja's music, they panned Knudsen's awkward libretto as a dramatic failure. As a result, the  inaugural stage production received only three performances and thus marked the first setback of Madetoja's career, the previous major works of whom—three symphonies and an opera—the critics had received enthusiastically.

Today, the work is better known in its abridged form, a six-movement suite for orchestra that Madetoja excerpted from the stage production's score. The composer's plans for an additional two suites never materialized, although in 2009, Estonian conductor Arvo Volmer pieced together a collection of eight remaining numbers from the original score, dubbed  Okon Fuoko Suite II. Volmer, conducting the Oulu Symphony Orchestra, also has produced the only recording of the complete score.

History 
While on his way to Paris in 1925, Madetoja had met a music publisher from Copenhagen, Wilhelm Hansen, who placed him into contact with the Danish playwright Poul Knudsen. A libretto for a new ballet-pantomime, based upon "exotic" Japanese themes, was on offer and Madetoja accepted the project with alacrity. In fact, the libretto was first offered to Jan Sibelius, who had earlier collaborated with Knudsen on the ballet-pantomime Scaramouche, Op. 71. (1913; fp. 1922). Sibelius, however, was at the time deep into the composition of his Sixth Symphony and thus refused the project.

Having outlined his plan for the new commission while staying in Houilles, Madetoja more or less composed the Third Symphony and Okon Fuoko simultaneously, although the pressure to complete the former was so great that he was compelled to place the ballet-pantomime aside until December 1926. Although Madetoja completed the score in late 1927, scheduling the ballet-pantomime's premiere in Copenhagen proved difficult, despite the enthusiasm of the chief conductor of the Royal Danish Orchestra,  Georg Høeberg, who after a test rehearsal had proclaimed the score a "masterpiece". The primary cause of the delay appears to have been the difficulty of casting a lead actor, as the part required both singing and miming; Knudsen insisted upon—and opted to wait for—an actor then on leave from the theatre, Johannes Poulsen.

The performance was the first significant setback of Madetoja's career: although the critics "unanimously praised" Madetoja's music, the consensus opinion was that Knudsen's libretto—with its awkward mixture of song, melodramatic spoken dialogue, dance, and pantomime—was a dramatic failure. In the end, Okon Fuoko received only three performances total and the Danish premiere never took place.

Structure

Complete score 

 Scenes 1–3: Okon Fuoko Paints Umegava's Face
 Scenes 3–4: Okon Fuoko Plays to Umegava
 Scenes 6–7: The Chorus' Song
 Scene 8: Umegava Stops Smiling
 Scene 8: Yiai's Song I
 Scene 8: Okon Fuoko and Yiai Recall Their Early Love 
 Scene 8: Yiai's Song II
 Scene 8: Yiai Tells of a Dream
 Scene 9: The Guests Arrive I
 Scene 10: The Tea Ceremony
 Scene 11: Puppet Dance I: Geishas and Warriors
 Scene 11: Puppet Dance II: Woman and Man
 Scene 12: Puppet Dance III: Old Man, Woman, and Young Warrior 
 Scene 13: Puppet Dance III: Enter Six Old Men 
 Scene 14: Hara-kiri
 Scene 15: The Guests Converse
 Scene 16: The Guests Arrive II
 Scene 16: Okon Fuoko's Recitative 
 Scenes 16–17: Yiai Shows the Guests Umegava 
 Scene 17: Umegava's Mechanical Dance
 Scene 18: The Guests Converse 
 Scene 18: Okon Fuoko's Dance to Umegava 
 Scenes 18–20: The Chorus' Song 
 Scene 20: Yiai Dances 
 Scene 21: Night Falls 
 Scenes 21–22: Umegava Comes to Life
 Scene 22: Okon Fuoko's and Umegava's Dance I
 Scene 22: Okon Fuoko's and Umegava's Dance II
 Scene 23: The Storm
 Scenes 23–24: Umegava Dances Yiai's Dance 
 Scene 24: Umegava's Seductive Dance
 Scenes 25–27: Umegava Picks Up the Sword
 Umegava's Demonic Dance (Sword Dance)
 Scene 28: Puppet Dance IV: The Storm and Okon Fuoko's Death
 Scenes 28–31: Yiai's Song I
 Scenes 31–33: Okon Fuoko Dies

Suite I

Suite II

Discography 

Overall, the critics have received Okon Fuoko favorably. In his review of Volmer’s recording of the complete ballet-pantomime, Fanfare’s Phillip Scott notes that in the score the typically-nationalistic Madetoja "[resists] any temptation to whip up excitement," instead utilizing an orchestra "pared back to the barest essentials" and embracing a sound world that is "cool", "stark", and "emotionally detached". Nevertheless, Scott finds that Okon Fuoko "weaves a powerful, cumulative spell", its "beguiling … gentle, pentatonic melodies" aided by Volmer’s "thoughtful … beautifully recorded" performance, and finishes by giving the disc a favorable recommendation. The American Record Guide's Jack Sullivan also applauds Volmer's massive undertaking, describing Madetoja's "hypnotic" score as having "melody aplenty and attractive harmony", although he finds the score's "subtlety and delicacy" to be its "most striking" feature. Indeed, with music that is "by turns rapturous, pungent, and tragic," Sullivan concludes that a listener could be forgiven for wondering how on earth Okon Fuoko has been neglected for so long.

See also 
 List of ballets by title

Notes, references, and sources

Notes

References

Sources 

Books

CD liner notes

Ballets by Leevi Madetoja
Suites by Leevi Madetoja
20th-century classical music
1927 compositions
1927 ballet premieres